Kelly O'Neill (born 20 April 1991) is an Australian rules footballer who played for the St Kilda Football Club in the AFL Women's (AFLW).

AFLW career
O'Neill signed with St Kilda during the first period of the 2019 expansion club signing period in September. In August 2020, she was delisted by St Kilda.

References

External links 

1991 births
Living people
St Kilda Football Club (AFLW) players
Australian rules footballers from Victoria (Australia)